Old Stock Americans, Pioneer Stock, or Colonial Stock are Americans who are descended from the original settlers of the Thirteen Colonies of mostly European ancestry who emigrated to British America in the 17th and the 18th centuries.

These Old Stock Americans, primarily English Protestants, saw historically Catholic immigrants as a threat to traditional American republican values, as they were loyal to the papacy.

Settlement in the colonies
Between 1700 and 1775, the overwhelming majority of settlers to the colonies (around 75%) were Britons of varying ethnic backgrounds such as English, Scottish, Welsh, and Ulster-Scots with initial settlements focused on the colonial hearths of Virginia, New England and Bermuda under Elizabeth I, James VI and I and Charles I. By 1776 there were between 2 and 2.5 million colonists in the Thirteen Colonies.

Early European settlers
Populations of French Huguenots, Dutch, Swedes, and Germans arrived before 1776, some as fellow royal subjects, other populations as legacies of earlier colonies such as New Netherland, which became the Middle Colonies of British America, and the Dutch colonial capital of New Amsterdam retained a distinct commercial cosmopolitan character as New York which became America's largest city. Ethnic Finns made up the majority of settlers of New Sweden colony which passed to Dutch and English rule. While small in number, Forest Finns left an outsized legacy, among European Americans uniquely accustomed to a pioneer life taming wilderness on frontiers of the Swedish Empire, bringing slash-and-burn agriculture and resourceful timber usage to the New World in the 17th century. From Tavastia, Savo and Karelia, Finnish log cabin architecture arrived early in colonial America, like the 1638 Nothnagle Cabin–adopted by later pioneer settlers like the Scotch-Irish to become symbols of American frontier culture advancing westward across North America. As the Scotch-Irish first resettled Ulster from the violent Scottish borderlands before departing for America, Forest Finns lived on the rough frontier borderlands of eastern Finland until the Swedish king invited them to resettle and clear wooded central Sweden, before remigrating to America. In 1776, a descendent of Finnish New Sweden settlers, John Morton, joined Benjamin Franklin and James Wilson to cast the deciding vote of the Pennsylvania delegation in support of independence and became a signer of the Declaration of Independence two days later.

British settlers in New England
While the majority of colonists were from Great Britain, these were not monolithic in ethnic, political, social, and cultural origins, but rather transplanted different Old World folkways to the New World. The two most significant colonies had been settled by opposing factions in the English Civil War and the wider Wars of the Three Kingdoms. The founders of Plymouth and Massachusetts Bay Colony in the North were mostly Puritans from East Anglia, who had been influenced by egalitarian Roundhead republican ideals of Oliver Cromwell's Commonwealth of England and the Protectorate; in New England they concentrated in towns where decisions were made by direct democracy, prizing communal conformity, social equality, and Puritan work ethic. Partially owing to the insularity of Puritan communities, colonial New England was far more homogeneously "English" than other regions, in contrast to the historically tolerant Dutch colonial parts of the Northeast, and more diverse colonies of the Mid-Atlantic and the South which from an early stage had strong elements of German and Scottish stock, from varying religious traditions.

British settlers in the Old South
Conversely, in Chesapeake Colonies to the south, the Colony of Virginia had been settled by their Cavalier royalist rivals—many younger sons of English gentry who fled Southern England when Cromwell took power, accompanied by indentured servants. Sir William Berkeley, colonial governor of Virginia, loyal to King Charles I, banished Puritans while offering refuge to the Virginia Cavaliers—many of whom became First Families of Virginia. For his colony's fidelity to the Crown, Charles II awarded Virginia its nickname "Old Dominion". In contrast to egalitarian and collectivist New England Colonies to the north, settlers of the Southern Colonies in Virginia, Maryland, Carolina, and Georgia recreated a hierarchical social order governed by an aristocratic American gentry which would dominate the antebellum Old South for generations. Sons of British nobility established American plantations where the planter class employed indentured servants to farm cash crops; later replaced by African slaves, especially in Deep South states where a feudal West Indies-style slave plantation economy developed. Freed English American indentured servants, along with Scottish Americans, Scotch-Irish Americans, Palatines and other German Americans arrived as hearty pioneers, taming harsh frontier wilderness to settle their own homesteads amid streams and hilly terrain, becoming old stock of the mountainous backcountry. To contrast against Yankee "Anglo-Saxon" democratic radicalism of New England, at times even English Americans in Dixie (especially in decades leading up to the American Civil War) would not only identify with chivalrous Cavaliers, but even assert a distinct aristocratic racial heritage as knightly heirs to the Normans who conquered and civilized 'barbaric' and unruly Anglo-Saxons of medieval England.

When Civil War did break out between the Confederacy and the Union in the 1860s, Confederate leaders traced the conflict back to the Old World, at least to the English Civil War–explicitly identifying their Unionists opponents (which were mostly from the North) with Oliver Cromwell's Puritans who settled the New England Colonies–highlighting the diversity even among old stock Anglo-Americans, less than a century after fighting the American Revolution together to achieve independence from The Crown.

19th century to present

Until the second half of the 20th century, Old Stock Americans dominated American culture and politics. Thousands of Germans and Irish immigrated to the rapidly industrializing United States during the 19th century and were met with strong opposition from the majority Protestant and temperance movement-minded Old Stock, who were anti-immigration and anti-Catholic.

US settlers arriving in droves to the newly acquired, formerly French Louisiana, Spanish Florida, and Spanish colonies (California, Texas, and New Mexico with Arizona), whether they were native born or of European origin, were labelled as "Anglos".

See also

19th-century Anglo-Saxonism
A History of the English-Speaking Peoples
Albion's Seed
American ancestry
American English
American ethnicity
American gentry
Americanism (ideology)
Americans or American people
Anglo America
Anglo-Americans
Anglo-Celtic Australian
Anglosphere
Boston Brahmins
British American
Colonial families of Maryland
Demographic history of the United States
English (ethnic group)
English Americans
English colonial empire
English diaspora
European American
First Families of Virginia
German Palatines
Henry Hudson
Historical racial and ethnic demographics of the United States
History of the Puritans in North America
Immigration to the United States
Jamestown, Virginia
Maps of American ancestries
Mayflower
Old Stock Canadians
Patriot (American Revolution)
Pennsylvania Dutch
Pilgrims
Plymouth colony
Puritans
Roanoke Colony
Roger Williams
Scotch-Irish American
Scottish American
Ulster Scots
Anglo-American relations
Virginia Company
Welsh American
White Anglo-Saxon Protestant
White Southerners
Who Are We? The Challenges to America's National Identity
William Penn
Yankee

References

American people
British-American culture
White American culture